Aloe is a genus of succulent plants, which includes several species:
 Aloe arborescens, krantz aloe
 Aloe camperi
 Aloe vera, "true aloe", cultivated for agricultural and medicinal use
 Aloe wildii

Aloe may also refer to

 Aloidendron, a genus formerly included in Aloe, known as tree aloes
 Aristaloe, a genus formerly included in Aloe
 Agarwood, also known as "aloeswood", or "lign-aloes"
 A.L.O.E. ("a Lady of England"), pen name of Charlotte Maria Tucker (1821-1893)
 The Aloe, a 1930 novel by Katherine Mansfield
 Aloe Blacc, stage name for American singer-songwriter, rapper and producer

See also
 Aloe Ridge Game Reserve, in Gauteng, South Africa
 List of Aloe species